The MSI World Scrabble Championship 2016 was a Scrabble tournament organised by Mattel and Mindsports International (MSI) to determine the world champion in English Scrabble. It was held from 31 August to 4 September 2016 in Lille, France. 

The event was split into two divisions based on players' World English-Language Scrabble Players' Association (WESPA) ratings. The top division comprised some 72 players. 24 games were played on the first three days, after which the top eight proceeded to a 3-game quarterfinals, with the winners advancing to a 5-game semifinals on the same day; the top two players, Brett Smitheram and Mark Nyman, played a best-of-five final the day after for the top prize of €7,000. Smitheram beat Nyman 3–0. The World Championship was held in conjunction with that of Scrabble in other languages.

Background

The MSI World Scrabble Championship 2016 was held from 31 August to 4 September 2016 under the auspices of Mindsports International and sponsored by Mattel and HarperCollins (the publisher of the official lexicon used in play), as part of the Mindsports International 2016 Championships. The playing venue was the Lille Grand Palais. There were two divisions based on players' WESPA ratings: A (1700 and above, or by invitation by WESPA or the World Mind Sports Federation) and B (below 1700 or unrated). MSI also hosted World Championships in other languages, including French, German, Spanish and Catalan, alongside the French Duplicate Championship.

Participants
The top division comprised a total of 72 players, as listed below alphabetically.

 , 2107
 , 2094
 , 2025
 , 1709
 , 1736
 , 2170
 , 1520
 , 1985
 , 1869
 , 1812
 , 2157
 , 1511
 , 1795
 , 2220
 , 2013
 , 2002
 , 2168
 , 2048
 , 1767
 , 2015
 , 2053
 , 1969
 , 2061
 , 1837
 , 1781
 , 1573
 , 1093
 , 1500
 , 1437
 , 2012
 , 1565
 , 1869
 , 1047
 , 1632
 , 1986
 , 1990
 , 1528
 , 2145
 , 1140
 , 1717
 , 2115
 , 1817
 , 2065
 , 1870
 , 1804
 , 1730
 , 1702
 , 1792
 , 1705
 , 1923
 , 2258
 , 1539
 , 1770
 , 2015
 , 2053
 , 1571
 , 1828
 , 1816
 , 1808
 , 2024
 , 1661
 , 1588
 , 1821
 , 1797
 , 1655
 , 1851
 , 1933
 , 1747
 , 1928
 , 1873
 , 2132
 , 1774

Results

Preliminary
After 24 preliminary rounds, the top eight advanced to the quarterfinals. Three-time World Champion Nigel Richards (2007, 2011, and 2013) failed to qualify for the knockout rounds, as did 2015 and 2014 World Champions Wellington Jighere and Craig Beevers.

Source:

Knockout		

Source:

Semi-finals losers Lewis MacKay and 2005 World Champion Adam Logan were scheduled to play a best-of-three third-place playoff, but Logan forfeited and MacKay automatically clinched the title of second runner-up.

Finals

Source:

UK-based recruitment consultant Brett Smitheram beat fellow Englishman and writer Mark Nyman, the 1993 World Scrabble Champion, 3–0 in the best-of-five finals, and became the 2016 World Scrabble Champion and won €7,000. Notable plays by Smitheram included BRACONID for 181 points (176 points plus 5 points for an unsuccessful challenge by Nyman), GYNAECIA (95) and PERIAGUA (76). Incidentally, Smitheram was a former contestant on the television programme Countdown, and Nyman was one of its producers. In the second division, Jack Mpakaboari beat Sandy Nang 3–0 in a best-of-five finals.

References

2016
2016 in French sport
September 2016 sports events in Europe